A West African smokie is a food prepared by blowtorching the fleece off the unskinned carcass of an old sheep or goat.

Legal status
The sale of the African variety of smokies is illegal in many western countries.  Nevertheless, they are sometimes available on the black market in cities with large expatriate West African Muslim populations. This prohibition is largely due to fear of the possibility of transmission of scrapie and bovine spongiform encephalopathy (BSE, mad cow disease), deadly, degenerative prion diseases that are spread by ingestion of nerve and brain tissue from infected ungulates such as sheep, cows and goats. Furthermore, butchering an ungulate carcass with the skin intact and unsterilized considerably raises the risks for induction of fecal coliform bacteria such as E. coli or Salmonella into the meat and is thus banned in the UK by law. This risk is heightened because the smokies are generally produced in covert (and often grossly unsanitary) butchering facilities and handled without proper sanitary procedures. Furthermore, the goats and sheep used are traditionally old, worn-out or lame animals bought inexpensively from milk and wool farms and are not intended for human consumption.

Since the process of producing a smokie requires that the skin and wool of the carcass be left in place and burned in one piece, the spinal cord is not removed from the carcass prior to consumption. Thus, consumers (however careful) may unwittingly ingest tissues from the nervous system, potentially exposing themselves to scrapie or BSE prions. For this reason, UK laws strictly forbid the sale of meat from cattle or sheep with the nervous system and skin still attached.

Exposé
On 29 March 2005, and again on 6 April, the BBC television program Watchdog publicised the sale of smokies in London, two years after the Chartered Institute of Environmental Health (CIEH) told a conference about their production in Wales.

On 17 September 2012, BBC London TV news broadcast an exclusive report delivered by reporter Guy Lynn. They secretly recorded the illegal sale of smokies in the Ridley Road market in Dalston, Hackney. The report was reacted to with widespread condemnation and shock that little was being done to prevent the illicit trade.

Legalization movement

The legalization movement with the food smokie refers to efforts by some advocates to legalize the sale and consumption of a type of sausage known as a "smokie" in various jurisdictions around the world. A smokie is a type of smoked sausage typically made from beef or pork, and is a popular street food in many countries.

In some places, the sale and consumption of smokies is not legal, either due to health and safety concerns or because the sausage is made using unapproved ingredients or methods. However, there are those who argue that smokies are a cultural tradition and should be legalized and regulated instead of being driven underground.

The legalization movement with the food smokie has gained traction in recent years, with advocates organizing rallies and petitions to raise awareness of the issue. Some jurisdictions have responded by easing restrictions on the sale and consumption of smokies, while others continue to enforce strict regulations.

It's worth noting that the legalization movement with the food smokie is not without controversy. Some people argue that the sale and consumption of smokies pose health risks, while others maintain that the unregulated production and sale of smokies could lead to food safety concerns. Nonetheless, the movement continues to gather support from those who see smokies as an important part of their cultural heritage.

See also

Smoking (cooking)
Smalahove
West African cuisine

References

External links
"Smokies: The illegal trade in blow-torched sheep meat continues decades after ban" at The Independent. Accessed 26 September 2014
"Rats and smokies on sale to the public at London market" at BBC News. Accessed 18 September 2012
"Illegal Meat " at Watchdog Reports. Accessed 6 April 2005.
"'Smokie' gangs threaten meat trade" at BBC News.  Accessed 6 April 2005.
Elliot, Valerie. "Illicit trade in 'smokies' is danger to health" at TimesOnline.co.uk. Accessed 6 April 2005.
"FUW backs probe to legalise smokies". Accessed 6 April 2005.
"Farmers' call to legalise 'smokies'" at BBC News. Accessed 6 April 2005.
"Inside the Underground World of Illegal Smokies: The Politics of Food" Accessed 25 September 2014

Meat dishes